McIntyre-Burri House is a historic home located at St. Joseph, Missouri.  It was built about 1870, and is a two-story, Italianate style brick dwelling. A rear frame addition was constructed in 1907, when the house was converted to a duplex. It has a low pitched cross-gable roof, segmental arched openings, and a full-width front porch with Tuscan order columns.

It was listed on the National Register of Historic Places in 2005.

References

Houses on the National Register of Historic Places in Missouri
Italianate architecture in Missouri
Houses completed in 1870
Houses in St. Joseph, Missouri
National Register of Historic Places in Buchanan County, Missouri